In the 2011–12 season, the second division of the South African football league (SAFA Second Division) was divided into two groups, Inland Stream and Coastal Stream.

Playoffs

The tournament, featuring the winners of each of the nine provincial divisions, will be divided into two groups.

Group A (Inland Stream)

Group B (Coastal Stream)

Playoff Final

External links
SAFA Official Website -database with results of Vodacom League

SAFA Second Division seasons
3
South